The Lower Se San/Sre Pok 2 scheme is a proposed hydroelectric dam to be located in Stung Treng Province, Cambodia on the Tonle Sre Pok some  upstream of its confluence with the Se San, and about  upstream of the confluence of the combined Sre Pok, Se San and Se Kong rivers with the Mekong mainstream.

Prefeasibility Study, the project aims to construct and operate an installed capacity  low head hydroelectric generating facility on the Sre Pok River, generating annually , run-of-river dam, reservoir  
Main components include construction of a concrete gravity dam, the powerhouse and generating equipment, environmental and social mitigation measures, and the 220-kV transmission line to Stung Treng and onwards to the Vietnamese border to interconnect with the Vietnamese grid backbone.

The scheme has a much smaller reservoir area than the Lower Se San 2 site and consequently a lesser environmental impact. The number of inhabitants in the reservoir area for resettlement is also significantly less. The dam is low in height, but could still have a significant impact on navigation and fish migration, which is a particular concern at all sites in this area. Allowances have been made in the scheme design and cost estimate for mitigation of these impacts, so far as is possible.

Per MIME report to RPTCC-4 meeting (Yangon, Sept. 2005), commissioning of 222 MW Lower Sre Pok HPP will be in 2017.

Impact: Up to 1000 people may rewire resettlement.

See also

 Mekong
 Mekong River

References

External links

Dams in the Mekong River Basin
Proposed hydroelectric power stations
Hydroelectric power stations in Cambodia
Dams in Cambodia
Stung Treng province
Proposed renewable energy power stations in Cambodia